Scottish singer-songwriter Emeli Sandé has written and recorded songs for her debut studio album, Our Version of Events (2012), and has written songs for other singers. She worked with Naughty Boy (credited as a songwriter with his legal name Shahid Khan) for the majority of the songs on the album, including writing "Where I Sleep" and "River" together. He appears as a featured artist on the single "Daddy", which was co-written by Grant Mitchell, James Murray and Mustafa Omar. Sandé and Naughty Boy collaborated with Harry Craze, Hugo Chegwin and Mike Spencer on the album's lead single "Heaven", which peaked at number one on the UK Dance Chart. The song was conceptualised when she had a "deep conversation about religion" with Naughty Boy, and she stated that it was written very quickly. Sandé co-wrote the song "My Kind of Love" with Grammy Award winning producer Emile Haynie, and co-wrote the song "Hope" with American singer-songwriter Alicia Keys. In August 2011, record executive Simon Cowell named Sandé his "favourite songwriter" of the moment.

Aside from writing material for her debut album, Sandé has worked with a multitude of singers on songs that have been included on their albums. She reunited with Keys for the latter's fifth studio album Girl on Fire (2012). The pair wrote "101", "Not Even the King" and "Brand New Me". "Brand New Me" was released as the second single from Girl on Fire; the collaborative process of writing with Sandé was described by Keys as being "instant magic". Sandé wrote the song "Half of Me" alongside Naughty Boy and production team Stargate, which was included on Rihanna's seventh studio album, Unapologetic (2012). The singer also contributed to several songs on Leona Lewis' third studio album Glassheart (2012), including the lead single "Trouble", "I to You" and "Sugar". Sandé appeared as a guest vocalist on Professor Green's song "Read All About It" and Labrinth's song "Beneath Your Beautiful". Both songs were co-written by herself and both peaked at number one on the UK Singles Chart and UK R&B Chart.

Songs

Notes

References

 
Sande, Emeli, List of songs written by